Sonat-Verlag covers the segments of the Berliner Chormusik-Verlag and the Edition Musica Rinata. It is a publishing house for vocal, instrumental and organ music in Kleinmachnow near Berlin.

History 
The publishing house was founded in 2000 in Berlin as ‘Berliner Chormusik-Verlag’ by Stefan Rauh. Originally, he had specialised on publishing choir music only. In 2009 the product range was expanded by the editions of the ‘Edition Musica Ritinata’, so that the variety of published works now also included compositions for organ and other instruments. The programs of both publishing houses, now consolidated, were developed further. 2013 the company moved to Kleinmaschnow, Potsdam. January 2015 both company parts were united under the name Sonat-Verlag.

Focus 
Potential buyers are primarily directors of choirs and organists with an interest in eclectically applicable scores for liturgical services, concerts and classes. The publisher’s program comprises sacred and secular choir music, chamber music, vocal solo and organ music ranging from baroque to modernity. Currently, about 3,000 titles are available. In addition to numerous first editions and revised reprints, an emphasis in the ecumenical program is placed on the collaboration with contemporary composers. Furthermore, recordings with works from the publishing program are available.

The graphic presentation of the individual edition’s scores shows artistic and technical competence that is essential for a reproduction of the works.

Musical series 
 Chorwerke der Sing-Akademie
Editors are professor Kai-Uwe Jirka and Christian Flips. With this series the publishing company supports the trend-setting work of the emerging Sing-Akademie. All compositions were written by the directors of the Sing-Akademie, Berlin, or musicians associated with the Sing-Akademie.
 Gemeindelieder im Chor
Consists of vocal scores, which differ from the organ accompanied hymns sung by the community or which accompany the community’s singing.
 Lichtfelder Chorblatt
The Berliner Chormusik-Verlag was first situated in Berlin-Lichtenfelde, from which derives the title of this series of quickly and easily learnable scores of folk songs and hymns.
 Sammlungen Orgel
Consists of a collection of organ scores with various thematic emphases.
 Werke für den Königlichen Hof- und Domchor
In this series, works are published which were specifically composed for the Königlichen Hof- und Domchor zu Berlin, the present-day state and cathedral chorus, or which were created in its environment.

References

External links 
 Berliner Chormusikverlag in DNB
 Edition Musica Renata in DNB
 Website Sonat-Verlag

Music publishing companies of Germany
Sheet music publishing companies
Opera publishing companies